National Highway 501, commonly referred to as NH 501 is a national highway in  India. It is a spur road of National Highway 1. NH-501 traverses the union territory of Jammu and Kashmir in India.

Route description 
Panchtarni - Chandanwari - Pahalgam - Batakut - Martand - Khanabal.

Major intersections 

  Terminal near Panchtarni.
  Terminal near Khanabal.

See also 

 List of National Highways in India
 List of National Highways in India by state

References

External links 

 NH 501 on OpenStreetMap

National highways in India
National Highways in Jammu and Kashmir